Afriyie Acquah (born 5 January 1992) is a Ghanaian professional footballer who plays as a midfielder for Iraqi club Al-Quwa Al-Jawiya and the Ghana national team.

Early life
He speaks Italian, having learnt from his private tutor since he moved to Italy in 2010 and has a brother. Acquah said he had chosen shirt 94 in dedication of his mother, who was involved a car accident and survived that year.

Club career

Early career
Born in Accra, Greater Accra, Ghana, Acquah began his career in Glentoran Football Academy in Sunyani, Ghana, which established by Christopher Forsythe an Irish National from Sunyani. During his Glentoran's career, Acquah was awarded as "Best Ghanaian midfielder's Under-14".

He later transferred to Bechem United as the Northern Irish club unable to sign him, due to work permit issues, despite travelling with Christopher Forsythe to Belfast to train with the first team. In April 2009, he played for Bechem United against Italian club Empoli.

Palermo
On 1 February 2010, Palermo signed Acquah from Ghanaian club D.C. United Agogo for free, but €500,000 agent fee went to SCMG Sport Consulting & Management GmbH. Palermo was fined by FIGC as it violated the third-party ownership rule in April 2012. FIGC found that Acquah had signed a contract with the agent in June 2009 as he was unable to join any club aboard until he turned 18.

After choosing number 94 shirt, Acquah made his Palermo debut, coming on as a substitute for Giulio Migliaccio in the 32nd minute, in 4–2 loss against Fiorentina on 13 February 2011. After making four appearances by the start of April, Acquah signed a five-year contract, keeping him until 2016.

Parma (loan)
On 16 July 2012, Palermo announced to have loaned Acquah to Serie A rivals Parma for €100,000; the agreement also includes an option for Parma to acquire half of the player's transfer rights by the end of the season.

Hoffenheim
In January 2013 moved to German Bundesliga club Hoffenheim for €2.5 million fee on a four-year deal  but he was not given any opportunity to play a single match until the end of the 2012–13 season.

Return to Parma (loan)
In July 2013, he returned to Parma on a season-long loan deal and won his place back, finishing 27 league appearances in the 2013–14 season. During the season, Acquah scored his first professional goal of his career, in a 4–2 loss against Roma on 2 April 2014. Subsequently, the loan was extended for another year.

Sampdoria (loan)
In February 2015, his loan spell at Parma was terminated early and he moved to fellow Serie A side Sampdoria, again on loan. He made his Sampdoria debut, playing 90 minutes, in a 2–1 loss against Chievo.

Torino
On 19 June 2015, he was signed by Torino on a four-year contract.

Empoli
On 17 August 2018, Acquah signed with Serie A team Empoli.

Yeni Malatyaspor 
On 23 August 2019, after his contract with Empoli ended, Acquah joined Turkish club Yeni Malatyaspor on a two-year contract with the option to extend for an extra year. After playing for a year, he was appointed as the deputy captain of the club and given his favourite number 6 jersey.

Al Batin 
On 22 June 2021, Acquah signed a two-year deal with Saudi Arabian club Al Batin FC as a free agent after his contract with Yeni Malatyaspor expired. He was released on 1 January 2022.

Al-Quwa Al-Jawiya 
On 1 February 2023, Acquah joined Iraqi club Al-Quwa Al-Jawiya.

International career
On 26 February 2012, Acquah was called up to the Ghana squad to face Chile. Acquah made his senior Ghana debut against Chile on 29 February 2012 at the PPL Park in Chester, Pennsylvania, USA. On 13 October 2012, in Civo Stadium, Lilongwe he scored a goal for Ghana against Malawi.

In May 2014, Acquah was named in a provisional 26-man squad in the FIFA World Cup by Ghana manager James Kwesi Appiah. On 2 June 2014, Acquah was selected in Ghana's squad for the 2014 tournament. Acquah made his World Cup debut, coming on as a substitute for Mohammed Rabiu in the 76th minute, in a 2–1 loss against Portugal.

Style of play
A strong, talented and tenacious player, Acquah usually plays as a defensive midfielder in front of the defence, due to his pace, physicality, stamina and abilities as a ball-winner. Although he is primarily known for his defensive coverage, he is a versatile player, who can play anywhere in midfield; he has also been used in more advanced roles, or as a central midfielder, where he is capable of helping his team both offensively and defensively due to his work-rate, composure, temperament, consistency, and ability to make attacking runs into the opposition's penalty area. Despite his lack of particularly notable technical skills, he has also been used as a deep-lying playmaker on occasion, due to his solid first touch, ability to set the tempo of his team's play and subsequently start attacking plays with long balls after winning back possession. Although naturally right-footed, he is capable of striking or passing the ball well with either foot. His precocious performances as youngster and energetic playing style in midfield have drawn comparisons with compatriot Michael Essien.

Career statistics

Club

International

Honors
Ghana
Africa Cup of Nations runner-up: 2015

References

External links

1992 births
Living people
Ghanaian footballers
Ghana international footballers
Association football utility players
Association football defenders
Association football midfielders
Palermo F.C. players
Parma Calcio 1913 players
TSG 1899 Hoffenheim players
U.C. Sampdoria players
Torino F.C. players
Empoli F.C. players
Yeni Malatyaspor footballers
Al Batin FC players
Al-Quwa Al-Jawiya players
Serie A players
Süper Lig players
Saudi Professional League players
Iraqi Premier League players
Ghanaian expatriate footballers
Expatriate footballers in Italy
Expatriate footballers in Germany
Expatriate footballers in Turkey
Expatriate footballers in Saudi Arabia
Ghanaian expatriate sportspeople in Italy
Ghanaian expatriate sportspeople in Germany
Ghanaian expatriate sportspeople in Turkey
Ghanaian expatriate sportspeople in Saudi Arabia
Ghanaian expatriate sportspeople in Iraq
2014 FIFA World Cup players
2015 Africa Cup of Nations players
2017 Africa Cup of Nations players
2019 Africa Cup of Nations players